Cearadactylus is a genus of large anhanguerid pterodactyloid pterosaur from the Romualdo Formation of Brazil, South America. Fossil remains of Cearadactylus dated back to the Albian stage of the Early Cretaceous period, about 112 million years ago. The only known species is C. atrox, described and named in 1985 by Giuseppe Leonardi and Guido Borgomanero. The name refers to the Brazilian state Ceará, and combines this with Greek daktylos, "finger", a reference to the wing finger of pterosaurs. The Latin atrox means "frightful", a reference to the fearsome dentition of the species.

Discovery
The holotype of Cearadactylus is MN 7019-V (formerly CB-PV-F-O93), which was discovered in the Romualdo Formation of the Santana Group in the Araripe plateau of northeastern Brazil. It was traded to Italy in 1983 and bought by Borgomanero for his collection. The skull is severely damaged, especially on the top, and was perhaps reconstructed by the fossil dealer.

 
As shown by a later preparation by the Brazilian Museu Nacional, in the first preparation many serious mistakes were made. The fronts of the snout and of the lower jaws were confused leading to a reconstruction in which the anterior part of the head was upside down. The teeth were extensively restored and enlarged until the wider front of the jaws showed very large and robust teeth projecting outwards, forming a sort of "rosette". This kinked upper jaw and its interlocking teeth suggested a piscivorous diet, allowing the animal to keep hold of slippery fish. No crests seemed to be present. The new preparation made clear that a crest was present on the snout and that the rosette was a lot smaller. Many details were discovered that were useful in determining the phylogenetic position of Cearadactylus.

In 1993, Fabio Marco Dalla Vecchia named a second species, Cearadactylus ligabuei. The specific name honors Giancarlo Ligabue, the director of the Centro Studi Ricerche Ligabue in Venice. The skull consists of two pieces, the front and the back part, glued together by fossil traders; it is uncertain whether they belong to the same individual or indeed to the same species. Dalla Vecchia was himself not convinced the new species in fact belonged to Cearadactylus, but the skull was not sufficiently unique to base its own genus on yet still too different from known species to be assigned to them, so he created a new species for the genus the fossil most resembled. Later authors have consistently denied the identity referring to the taxon as "Cearadactylus" ligabuei.

Dalla Vecchia assigned C. ligabuei to the Cearadactylidae. Kellner concluded it was probably a member of Anhangueridae; Unwin in 2002 even named it Anhanguera ligabuei. In 2005, Steel et al. suggested that it was a Coloborhynchus ligabuei.

Description
 
Peter Wellnhofer in 1991 estimated a wingspan of 5.5 meters (18 ft).

Classification
Leonardi did abstain from assigning the genus to a family. Wellnhofer created a special family called Cearadactylidae, but this concept is no longer used. In 2000, Alexander Kellner concluded that it was related to, but lacking a crest not part of, the Anhangueridae within the larger group Pteranodontoidea sensu Kellner. In 2002 however, David Unwin stated it was a highly deviant member of the family Ctenochasmatidae. In 2010, Kellner entered the new information into three existing databases of pterosaur features, to calculate through cladistic analysis the position of Cearadactylus in the phylogenetic tree. Although the three resulting trees differed, all had in common that Cearadactylus was close to the Anhangueridae. In 2012, Pereda-Suberbiola et al. found Cearadactylus within the group Ctenochasmatoidea, part of a polytomy that also comprises Gnathosaurus and Ardeadactylus (identified as Pterodactylus longicolum in the analysis). Subsequent recent analysis however, have found Cearadactylus as a member of the group Anhangueria, and depending on the different analyses, Cearadactylus is either placed in a more derived or basal position. A phylogenetic analysis by Pentland et al. in 2019 for example, had found Cearadactylus in a derived position within the Anhangueria, just outside the Ornithocheirae, which, by their definition, is the clade that contains the families Ornithocheiridae and Anhangueridae. Their cladogram is shown on the left. Other studies however, have concluded that Cearadactylus is a member of the family Anhangueridae, more specifically a member of the subfamily Anhanguerinae, sister taxon to Maaradactylus. The cladogram on the right shows a topology made by Borja Holgado and Rodrigo Pêgas in 2020.

Topology 1: Pentland et al. (2019).

Topology 2: Holgado & Pêgas (2020).

See also 
 List of pterosaur genera
 Timeline of pterosaur research

References

Further reading 
 Dalla Vecchia, F. M. (1993), "Cearadactylus? ligabuei, nov. sp., a new Early Cretaceous (Aptian) pterosaur from Chapada do Araripe (Northeastern Brazil)", Bolletini della Societa Paleontologica Italiano, 32: 401–409

Pteranodontoids
Early Cretaceous pterosaurs of South America
Aptian life
Cretaceous Brazil
Fossils of Brazil
Romualdo Formation
Fossil taxa described in 1985